The Man Who Won is a 1919 American silent drama film directed by Paul Scardon and written by Edward J. Montagne.  The film stars Harry T. Morey, Maurice Costello, and Betty Blythe.

Cast list

References

1919 films
American silent feature films
American black-and-white films
1919 drama films
Films directed by Paul Scardon
Vitagraph Studios films
1910s American films